Melhores do Ano Troféu Domingão, or just Melhores do Ano (Best of the Year), is an annual awards ceremony presented by TV Globo. Viewers vote on three artists who have been brilliant and successful during the year on the network, in music and in sports. Nominees are previously chosen by the network's executives and the top three go to the public vote. The prize is equivalent to a Golden Globe Award in Brazil because of the network's name.

Broadcast 
Originally, the awards were always broadcast on the last Sunday of the year, during Domingão do Faustão, until 2007. From 2008 to 2014, it was held in late March, when the awards were brought back to December. In 2021, the presentation moved to Domingão com Huck.

Categories

Current categories 
 Best telenovela actor (1995–present)
 Best telenovela actress (1995–present)
 Best supporting actor (1996–present)
 Best supporting actress (1996–present)
 Best new actor (1995–present)
 Best new actress (1996–present)
 Best actor in a TV series or miniseries (2014–present)
 Best actress in a TV series or miniseries (2014–present)
 Best young actor/actress (2002–present)
 Best female singer (1999–present)
 Best male singer (1999–present)
 Best journalist (2003–present)
 Song of the Year (1995–present)
 Best comedy actor/actress (1995–present)
 Best fictional character (2016–present)

Former categories  
 Best reporter (2014)
 Best band or duo (1999–2011)
 Best new musician (1998–2011)
 Best sportsman/sportswoman (2003–2009)
 Best special effects (2002)
 Best female contestant in a reality show (2002)
 Best male contestant in a reality show (2002)
 Best character's theme song (2002)
 Best opening theme song (2001–2002)
 Best telenovela song (2001–2007)
 Album of the Year (1999–2000)
 Star of the Year (1999–2000)
 Success of the Year (1995–1996)

Achievements

Telenovelas with more awards

Telenovelas with more nominations

Artists with more awards

Artists with more nominations

References

Brazilian awards
Awards established in 1995
1995 establishments in Brazil